Rock the Plank is the third full-length release from the Mad Caddies.

Track listing
 "Shaving Your Life" - 2:06 (music: Benson; lyrics: Benson, Robertson)
 "Mary Melody" - 3:09 (music: Lazor, Robertson; lyrics: Robertson)
 "B-Side" - 2:58 (Robertson)
 "Days Away" - 3:44 (Robertson)
 "Bridges" - 2:41 (Robertson)
 "We'll Start to Worry When the Cynics Start Believing" - 3:17 (Benson)
 "Weird Beard" - 2:44 (music: Lazor; lyrics: Robertson)
 "Easy Cheese" - 2:17 (Robertson)
 "Hound Bound" - 3:38 (music: Robertson, Lazor; lyrics: Robertson)
 "Depleted Salvo" - 2:59 (music: Benson; lyrics: Robertson)
 "Chevy Novacaine" - 2:39 (music: Benson; lyrics: Robertson)
 "Booze Cruise" - 2:25 (music: Benson; lyrics: Benson, Robertson)
 "All American Badass" - 2:41 (music: Lazor; lyrics: Robertson)

Mad Caddies albums
2001 albums
Fat Wreck Chords albums